State Route 16 (SR 16) is a state highway in the northern region of the U.S. state of California that runs from Route 20 in Colusa County to Route 49 just outside Plymouth in Amador County, primarily crossing the Sacramento Valley. Much of the route through the Sacramento area is unsigned as it runs on a concurrency with the I-5 and US 50 freeways.

Route description 
SR 16 is part of the California Freeway and Expressway System, and the eastern segment is part of the National Highway System, a network of highways that are considered essential to the country's economy, defense, and mobility by the Federal Highway Administration. SR 16 is eligible to be included in the State Scenic Highway System, but it is not officially designated as a scenic highway by the California Department of Transportation. It is known as the Stanley L. Van Vleck Memorial Highway from Dillard Road in Sacramento County to the Amador County line, honoring a former prominent leader in the state's agricultural organizations.

State Route 16 begins in Colusa County near Wilbur Springs at the junction with State Route 20. SR 16 goes south alongside Bear Creek, which enters a narrow canyon and joins with Cache Creek near the Yolo County line. SR 16 continues in the canyon, running close to the river, passing Cache Creek Canyon Regional Park, and emerging from the canyon north of Rumsey. This section is so prone to rock slides that there are permanent gates at each end.

SR 16 continues to parallel Cache Creek, at a greater distance, going south-east through Capay Valley, with Blue Ridge to its west and the Capay Hills (including Bald Mountain) to its east. It goes through  Rumsey, Guinda, Brooks, Cache Creek Casino Resort, Capay, Esparto (intersecting with County Route E4 to Dunnigan), and Madison.

East of Madison, and now in the Central Valley, SR 16 interchanges with Interstate 505 before heading east toward Woodland. In west Woodland it merges with County Road 22 and then turns north, concurrently with County Route E7 and Interstate 5 Business, until it meets its interchange with Interstate 5.

SR 16 then runs on I-5 from Woodland towards Sacramento in an unsigned concurrency. At the junction with US 50 in the southeastern part of Downtown Sacramento, SR 16 turns eastward on an unsigned concurrency with US 50. It then diverges from US 50 via Howe Ave., goes southward on Howe Ave. for a short distance, then runs eastbound on Folsom Blvd. SR then peels off from Folsom Blvd, less than a mile later as Jackson Road.

After it passes near Sloughhouse and Rancho Murieta, where it crosses the Cosumnes River, SR 16 enters Amador County. SR 16 then ascends into the Sierra Nevada foothills, leaving the Central Valley. In Amador County, SR 16 passes near Forest Home before intersecting with State Route 124 and terminating at State Route 49.

History 

The two ends of SR 16 were added to the state highway system by the third bond issue, passed by the state's voters in 1919: Route 50 from Lower Lake east to Rumsey and Route 54 from the Sacramento-Amador County line east to Drytown. Each was connected to Sacramento by existing or planned paved county highways. Although the exact alignment of Route 50 was not specified, the state Department of Engineering had already surveyed a 35-mile (56 km) route through Cache Creek Canyon pursuant to a 1915 law, which defined the Yolo and Lake Highway "following generally, the meanderings of Cache creek" but did not make it a state highway. By 1924, the California Highway Commission's engineers had realized that building Route 50 through the canyon was impractical, and adopted a substitute plan for two highways connecting Lower Lake and Rumsey with the planned Route 15 (Tahoe-Ukiah Highway, now State Route 20) to the north in September 1925. The western connection, to Lower Lake, became part of Route 49 (now State Route 53 there), which continued south from Lower Lake to Calistoga.

Each route was extended to Sacramento in 1933 over the aforementioned county highways, taking Route 50 southeast from Rumsey to Woodland near Cache Creek and then alongside the Sacramento River to the I Street Bridge, and Route 54 west from the county line to Route 11 just outside Sacramento. The entirety of both routes, from SR 20 near Wilbur Springs through Sacramento to State Route 49 just north of Drytown (and initially overlapping SR 49 to Jackson), was included in the initial state sign route system in 1934 as Sign Route 16. Through downtown Sacramento, SR 16 followed U.S. 40 (Legislative Route 6) and U.S. 50 (Legislative Route 11), mostly on Capitol Avenue, while Legislative Route 50 continued south on 5th Street (later a one-way pair of 3rd and 5th Streets) and turned east on Broadway, carrying Sign Route 24 most of the way to Freeport Boulevard. In the 1964 renumbering, Route 16 became the new legislative designation, and Sign Route 24 through Sacramento was replaced with State Route 99 and State Route 160. As neither of these used what had been Sign Route 24 along 3rd and 5th Streets and Broadway, part of Route 16's new definition ("Route 5 near Woodland to Sacramento") was used for several years on this alignment until it became part of State Route 99 later that decade. This left the western segment of SR 16 ending at Interstate 5 near the east end of the I Street Bridge until 1984, when the Woodland-Sacramento portion, which had become redundant with the parallel Interstate 5 complete, was deleted from the legislative definition. After this, SR 16 was rerouted from the intersection with County Route E7 to continue north on a bypass of Woodland instead of east to Interstate 5.

On September 15, 2014, Assembly Bill No. 1957 was passed, authorizing relinquishment of the segment of SR 16 in Eastern Sacramento near US 50.

Major intersections

See also

References

External links 

 AARoads - State Route 16
 Caltrans: Route 16 highway conditions
 California Highways: SR 16

016
State Route 016
State Route 016
State Route 016
State Route 016
U.S. Route 40
U.S. Route 50